Mark John Lynch (born 2 September 1981) is an English former professional footballer who played as a right-back. He began his career with Manchester United and spent most of the 2001–02 season on loan with Scottish club St Johnstone, but failed to break into the Manchester United first team on a regular basis. He went on to play for Sunderland, Hull City, Yeovil Town, Rotherham United, Stockport County and Altrincham before retiring from professional football in 2012.

Career
Born in Manchester, Lynch began his career with Manchester United. To gain first-team experience, he joined Scottish Premier League side St Johnstone on loan in October 2001 and made 20 appearances for the club. He made one senior appearance for Manchester United, against Deportivo de La Coruña in the UEFA Champions League in March 2003, in which he scored an own goal. In July 2004, Lynch moved to Sunderland on a free transfer. He made 11 appearances during the 2004–05 season and was allowed to leave in June 2005.

On 14 June 2005, Lynch signed for Championship club Hull City on a free transfer. He suffered a knee injury in the first minute of his Hull City debut in August 2005 against Queens Park Rangers, and in his first game back against Coventry City he was sent off. He made 15 further appearances for Hull in the 2005–06 season, the last of which was in January, and at the end of the season he was made available for transfer by manager Peter Taylor.

In August 2006, Lynch moved to Yeovil Town on loan but then signed on a permanent deal before the transfer deadline. He was released in May 2008.

Lynch signed a two-year deal Rotherham United on 27 May 2008. He made his Rotherham United debut against Lincoln City, and scored twice on his third appearance for the club against Morecambe.

On 14 July 2010, he signed for Stockport County, but was released on 31 January 2012. He subsequently joined Altrincham, but was released by the club at the end of the season after making eight first-team appearances.

References

External links

Mark Lynch at ManUtd.com
Profile at StretfordEnd.co.uk

1981 births
Living people
English footballers
National League (English football) players
English Football League players
Scottish Premier League players
Manchester United F.C. players
St Johnstone F.C. players
Sunderland A.F.C. players
Hull City A.F.C. players
Yeovil Town F.C. players
Rotherham United F.C. players
Stockport County F.C. players
Altrincham F.C. players
Association football defenders